Riddick is a 2013 science fiction action film written and directed by David Twohy, based on the character Richard B. Riddick by Jim and Ken Wheat. It is the third installment in the The Chronicles of Riddick film series and a sequel to both Pitch Black (2000) and The Chronicles of Riddick (2004). Vin Diesel reprises his role as the eponymous character alongside Jordi Mollà, Matthew Nable, Katee Sackhoff, Dave Bautista, Bokeem Woodbine, Raoul Trujillo, and Karl Urban. In the film, notorious murderer Riddick is betrayed and left for dead on a desolate planet and uses his instincts to survive. He eventually teams up with mercenaries arriving to capture him to escape from a larger threat.

Riddick was released on September 6, 2013, in the United States. It was shown in both conventional and IMAX Digital theaters. Critics considered it a return to form for the series and it became a moderate box-office success compared to its predecessor. A fourth film, entitled Riddick: Furya, is in development.

Plot
Five years after Kyra's death, Riddick has become uneasy in his role as Lord Marshal of the Necromonger fleet. His refusal to swear into the Necromonger faith has caused dissent among his subjects. After the latest attempt on his life, Riddick strikes a deal with Commander Vaako: the location of Furya and a ship to take him there, in exchange for Vaako succeeding him as the next Lord Marshal, so that he can achieve transcendence. Led by Vaako's aide, Krone, Riddick and a group of Necromongers arrive on a desolate planet. Realizing that it is not Furya, Riddick kills most of his escort when they attempt to assassinate him; Krone causes a landslide and buries Riddick alive.

Riddick emerges from the rubble with a broken leg, which he sets and splints while fending off native predators: vulture-like flying animals, packs of jackal-like beasts and giant venomous scorpion-like water-dwelling Mud Demons. Needing time to heal, Riddick hides himself within some abandoned ruins. After he's fully healed, Riddick notices a vast savanna beyond some rocky cliffs, but the only passage through is impeded by several muddy pools infested with Mud Demons. He begins injecting himself with Mud Demon venom to build an immunity and constructs improvised melee weapons, as well as raising and training an orphaned jackal-beast pup. He kills the Mud Demons and reaches the savanna. After finding a dormant mercenary station, Riddick notices a series of approaching storms, and concludes they will unleash an unidentified threat. Riddick activates an emergency beacon at the station, which broadcasts his identity to mercenary groups within the area.

Two ships arrive in answer to the beacon, the first led by violent and unstable Santana, with second-in-command Diaz, preacher Luna and hunters Falco, Rubio, Vargas and Nuñez. The second, a team of professional mercenaries: leader Colonel R. "Boss" Johns, second-in-command and marksman Dahl, tracker Lockspur and gunner Moss. Riddick leaves them a message promising they will all die unless they leave one of their ships and depart the planet on the other. Rubio, Nuñez and Falco are killed by Riddick during the first night, forcing a reluctant Santana to cooperate with Johns's team. Riddick later steals power nodes from each of the teams' ships and approaches Johns and Santana to strike a deal for their return. However, the conversation turns into an ambush as Dahl shoots Riddick with several rounds of horse tranquilizer, and Riddick's jackal-beast is shot and killed by Santana.

At the station, Johns interrogates Riddick about the fate of his son, William. When the storms reach the station, Riddick's threat is revealed as thousands of Mud Demons emerge from hibernation underground, awakened by the rainwater, and besiege the station, killing Lockspur and Moss. Johns agrees to release Riddick to locate the hidden power cells, but Santana attempts to kill Riddick because he is worth more dead than alive, and because Riddick promised to kill Santana if set free. Riddick, with one leg free, beheads Santana with his own machete. The group then releases Riddick on the condition he retrieve the nodes and each party gets a ship.

They fight their way to the ships, and Vargas is killed by a Mud Demon. Johns, Diaz and Riddick leave the ship together on the hoverbikes to retrieve the power nodes. During their journey, Diaz crashes Johns's bike over an embankment; Johns is then picked up by Riddick. After they reach the power nodes, Riddick reveals Johns's son's morphine addiction and attempt to use a child as bait. Diaz attacks Riddick and Johns but Riddick fights and kills him; as Diaz dies he shoots and disables the last hoverbike.

Riddick and Johns fend off an endless horde of Mud Demons while running back to the station. Riddick is severely wounded and Johns takes both nodes and abandons him. Riddick begins to fight the advancing Demons and climbs a rock spire; when it seems he is about to be killed, Johns arrives in a repowered ship and shoots the creatures while Dahl descends to rescue Riddick. Given the other ship, Riddick praises Johns for being a better man than his son and departs into deep space.

Cast
 Vin Diesel as Richard B. Riddick, last of the Furyan race and notorious criminal outlaw.  Riddick lets himself get complacent in his time as Lord Marshal and is suddenly forced to rediscover his animal side to survive.  
 Matthew Nable as Colonel R. "Boss" Johns, a professional mercenary whose son William J. Johns was killed during the events of Pitch Black.  Johns pursues Riddick in order to get answers about how his son died.  He prides himself on being an organized professional and runs his crew efficiently.
 Jordi Mollà as Santana, a bounty hunter whose crew is the first to arrive in pursuit of Riddick.  He bristles at the arrival of Johns and refuses to accept help until he has no choice.
 Katee Sackhoff as Dahl, Johns's Lieutenant.  She is a tough and capable mercenary and the crew's sniper.  She and Santana instantly dislike each other and she is forced to assert herself over him after Johns puts her in charge of Santana's crew.
 Dave Bautista as Diaz, Santana's Lieutenant.  He is quiet and reserved in contrast to the loud and obnoxious Santana.  
 Bokeem Woodbine as Moss, one of Johns's crew who has a quiet encounter with Riddick that leaves him shaken.
 Raoul Trujillo as Lockspur, a member of Johns's crew who has encountered the mud creatures before.
 Conrad Pla as Vargas, one of Santana's men who is highly superstitious.  
 Nolan Gerard Funk as Luna, a Christian whom Santana refers to as his good luck charm.  The voice of reason, he repeatedly tries to convince everyone to take Riddick's offer and leave rather than fight.
 Danny Blanco Hall as Falco, one of Santana's men.
 Noah Danby as Nuñez, another of Santana's crew.
 Neil Napier as Rubio
 Karl Urban as Commander Siberius Vaako, a Necromonger Commander who desires the position of Lord Marshal.  
 Alex Branson as Lex Branman
 Andreas Apergis as Krone, a Necromonger who betrays Riddick and leaves him to die.
 Keri Hilson as Santana's Prisoner, who was being kept as a sexual slave.

Production

Development
Rumors of a third film in the Chronicles of Riddick series had circulated since 2006. At first, Twohy assumed that the film would be an independent, low-budget production, rather than being released by Universal Studios as the other films in the series had been. Despite the second film's tepid reception, Diesel and Twohy remained optimistic about a third film, pushing it toward completion. "Everyone knows I love the Riddick character and I'm always working on it," Diesel asserted. "It just takes five years to make another one because David Twohy and I are so precise about it." In 2006, Diesel agreed to make a cameo in Universal's film The Fast and the Furious: Tokyo Drift in exchange for the ownership to the rights to the Riddick franchise and character. Over the next four years, Diesel periodically posted information on his own Facebook page updating fans on the film's progress. In November 2009, shortly after Twohy had finished the script, he announced that pre-production work was underway.

In April 2010, a review of the Riddick screenplay (it was then subtitled "Dead Man Stalking") appeared on the Coming Attractions website. "Free from the constraints of delivering a PG-13 movie, the dialogue in Dead Man Stalking is more suited to a film like Training Day; the mercs we meet are hard-living people, not those washout fakeout space mercs from a film like Alien: Resurrection", wrote reviewer Patrick Sauriol. On February 9, 2010, Diesel confirmed in an update on his Facebook page that one of the locations used in the upcoming sequel would be the White Desert in Farafra, Egypt. He mentioned the terrain features, unique to the area, would lend to the off-planet atmosphere of the film. On March 13, 2011, Diesel released a video on his official Facebook page in which he and Director David Twohy talk about the proposed third film. They reaffirmed that the movie will be rated 'R', like the first one (Pitch Black), a priority for them, and they plan to shoot it lean and quickly.

In September 2011, it was announced that Karl Urban would reprise his role as Vaako from The Chronicles of Riddick. In January 2012, it was announced that Katee Sackhoff and Matt Nable had also joined the cast. Since they did not have enough money to shoot the film in its entirety, Diesel had to mortgage his house, obtain loans and spend most of his personal money on the production of the film, "I had to leverage my house," Diesel said. "If we didn't finish the film, I would be homeless."

Principal photography
The first image of Vin Diesel on the film's set was released on January 20, 2012. Filming began in January 2012 and concluded at the end of March 2012. The film entered post production in April 2012. The teaser trailer for the film was released on March 22, 2013 via Vin Diesel's official Facebook page.

Reception

Critical response

Riddick was met with mixed reviews. At the film review aggregator website Rotten Tomatoes, the film has a 57% approval rating based on 168 reviews, with an average score of 5.3/10. The website's critical consensus states: "It may not win the franchise many new converts, but this back-to-basics outing brings Riddick fans more of the brooding sci-fi action they've come to expect". Metacritic, another review aggregation website, which assigns a weighted average rating out of 100 top reviews from mainstream critics, calculated a score of 49 out of 100 based on 35 reviews, indicating "mixed or average reviews".

Alonso Duralde of TheWrap gave the film a negative review, saying "If you were to make a comedy about an actor who makes cheesy sci-fi action movies, and you needed a hilarious clip of his work that underscored the awfulness of his output, just about any 30-second segment of Riddick would do the trick". Tom Huddleston of Time Out gave the film two out of five stars, saying "It's flavourless: the aliens are unscary and easily despatched, Vin's too silent to be interesting, and the other characters are either dull or offensive". Scott Foundas of Variety gave the film a positive review, saying "An improbable but very enjoyable sequel that recaptures much of the stripped-down intensity of Diesel and director David Twohy's franchise starter Pitch Black." Justin Lowe of The Hollywood Reporter gave the film a negative review, saying "Faithful to the template if not the spirit of previous installments, this flabby second sequel barely manages to advance Riddicks considerable personal mythology". Keith Staskiewicz of Entertainment Weekly gave the film a C+, saying "Twohy succeeds in staging moments both tense and funny, but they're fewer and farther between than one would hope, and the dialogue is served up with a heaping helping of cheese, especially when delivered in Diesel's low-frequency growl".

Box office
Riddick grossed $42,025,135 in North America, and $56,312,160 in other countries, for a worldwide total of $98,337,295. In North America, the film opened to number one in its first weekend, with $19,030,375. In its second weekend, the film dropped to number three, grossing an additional $6,841,800. In its third weekend, the film dropped to number eight, grossing $3,656,620. In its fourth weekend, the film dropped to number 13, grossing $1,607,145.

Release

Home media
Riddick was released on DVD and Blu-ray on December 31, 2013. The film grossed an additional $23,026,441 through domestic DVD and Blu-ray sales.

Differences in plot from theatrical release
A number of additions to the plot are included in the director's cut of the movie which was released on Blu-ray and DVD on December 31, 2013. and provided a longer story than the theatrical version. The extended cut of the movie is approximately 8 minutes longer than the theatrical version and includes extended and additional scenes not seen in the theatrical version.

In the extended version, there is an additional scene which takes place aboard the Necromonger capital ship where Riddick kills Krone and finds out that Vaako has crossed the threshold into the Underverse, seen as a large hole in space surrounded by gas. Riddick looks out the window as he is told that Vaako has gone to achieve transcendence, where he is both dead and alive.

Sequel
On January 29, 2014, Vin Diesel had announced on his Facebook page that Universal Pictures wishes to develop a fourth Riddick film prompted by robust DVD sales of the most recent film in the series.

In April 2016, Vin Diesel confirmed that he and writer-director David Twohy were developing a fourth Riddick movie titled Furia and a spin-off TV series titled Merc City. In May 2016, he explained that production on Furia may begin in early 2017. In a video Vin Diesel asked, "Are you guys excited to hear about Furia? Do you want to know where it all began with that dark character Riddick?" David Twohy confirmed that the new film would be rated R. The posts did not elaborate on how, if at all, Merc City would be connected to the upcoming film. 

By July 2019, the script was completed and the official title was changed to Riddick: Furya. The story focuses on the protagonist finally returning to his homeworld, a place he barely remembers and one he fears might be left in ruins by the Necromongers. Once there, he finds other Furyans fighting for their existence against a new enemy. 

By May 2022, it was reported that writer-director David Twohy was writing the film alongside original creators Jim and Ken Wheat and that the screenplay was completed in 2021. In May 2022, an Instagram post from Vin Diesel also suggested that pre-production has moved on to the storyboarding phase.

References

External links

  (broken link)
 
 
 
 

2013 films
2013 science fiction action films
American science fiction action films
American science fiction thriller films
American sequel films
Films directed by David Twohy
Films set in the future
Films shot in Montreal
IMAX films
Films set on fictional planets
The Chronicles of Riddick (franchise)
Entertainment One films
Universal Pictures films
One Race Films films
Films scored by Graeme Revell
Films with screenplays by David Twohy
2010s survival films
2010s English-language films
2010s American films
2013 thriller films